Lü Haidong (born 11 January 1992) is a Chinese footballer who currently plays as a left-back for Wuhan Three Towns.

Club career
Lü Haidong would play for second-tier football club Shanghai East Asia before joining another second division club with Chongqing Lifan in the 2011 China League One season. He would go on to establish himself as regular within the team and in 2014 China League One he would win the division title with them. In the top tier he was unable to gain much playing time and was allowed to join second-tier football club Shenzhen at the start of the 2016 China League One season. He would gradually start to establish himself as a regular within the team and go on to gain promotion with the club at the end of the 2018 China League One campaign.

The following season, Lü would help the team avoid relegation, however the club would bring in Jiang Zhipeng as the club's first choice left-back. With limited playing time he would be loaned out to second tier club Wuhan Three Towns for the 2021 China League One campaign. The move would turn out to be a big successes and he would go on to establish himself as a vital member of the team and help aid the club to win the league title and gain promotion as the club entered the top tier for the first time in their history. The following campaign Wuhan would make the move permanent and he would be part of the squad that won the 2022 Chinese Super League title.

Career statistics

Honours

Club
Chongqing Lifan
China League One: 2014

Wuhan Three Towns
Chinese Super League: 2022.
China League One: 2021

References

External links

1992 births
Living people
Chinese footballers
Association football defenders
China League One players
Chinese Super League players
Shanghai Port F.C. players
Chongqing Liangjiang Athletic F.C. players
Shenzhen F.C. players